Dizaj (also Romanized as Dīzaj and Dīzej; also known as Deh-e Sīq, Deh-i-Siq, Deh Sīb, and Dezej) is a village in Howmeh Rural District, in the Central District of Shahrud County, Semnan Province, Iran. At the 2006 census, its population was 1,879, in 554 families.

References 

Populated places in Shahrud County